Connor Creek is an unincorporated community located in Cassia County between Malta and Elba in the southern portion of the U.S. state of Idaho.

Name
Connor Creek is named after Colonel Patrick Edward Connor, a nineteenth-century military leader known for his campaigns against Indians in the American Old West.  Connor, who was stationed at Camp Douglas, Utah, ordered Captain Samuel P. Smith to attack Indians in Idaho.  Smith, acting under Connor's order, nearly annihilated a group of Indians in 1864 at the place now called Connor Creek.  This massacre was considered retaliation for an alleged battle three years prior in nearby Almo Creek, where Indians killed almost 300 emigrants who were moving through the area. However, James Loewen points out in "Lies Across America" that decades of research has led to no indication that any emigrants were killed in the Almo area.

Education 
Connor Creek is a part of the Cassia County School District.

Zoned schools include:
 Raft River Elementary School
 Raft River Junior/Senior High School

References

External links

Unincorporated communities in Cassia County, Idaho
Unincorporated communities in Idaho